Polson may refer to:

Polson, Montana, a city in the United States
Polson Airport, the public use airport of Polson, Montana
Polson (brand), an Indian dairy products brand
Polson Pier, entertainment venue in Toronto, Canada
Polson (surname)
Polson (Indian actor), an Indian actor featured in Upaasna, Tulsi Vivah and Jai Dwarkadheesh

See also
 Poulson (disambiguation)